Gordon Henry Guyatt (born November 11, 1953) is a Canadian physician who is Distinguished University Professor in the Departments of Health Research Methods, Evidence and Impact (formerly Clinical Epidemiology & Biostatistics) and Medicine at McMaster University in Hamilton, Ontario. He is known for his leadership in evidence-based medicine, a term that first appeared in a single-author paper he published in 1991. Subsequently, a 1992 JAMA article that Guyatt led proved instrumental in bringing the concept of evidence-based medicine to the world's attention.[2] In 2007, The BMJ launched an international election for the most important contributions to healthcare. Evidence-based medicine came 7th, ahead of the computer and medical imaging. [3][4] Guyatt's concerns with the role of the medical system, social justice, and medical reform remain central issues that he promoted in tandem with his medical work. On October 9, 2015, he was named to the Canadian Medical Hall of Fame.

Early life 
Guyatt was born and raised in Hamilton, home to McMaster University. On his father's side, he was the son of a deeply-rooted Protestant Hamilton family. His grandfather was a Hamilton physician and his father, a lawyer. On his mother's side, his roots were in Europe: his mother was a Czech Jew and Auschwitz and Belsen concentration camp survivor who immigrated to Hamilton.

Family life
Guyatt is married to Maureen Meade and has three daughters.

Education and training
Guyatt attended the University of Toronto where he obtained a Bachelor of Science. He then obtained his medical degree at McMaster University Medical School and certified as a general internist. Later, Guyatt received a Master of Science in Design, Management, and Evaluation (now known as Health Research Methodology) from McMaster University.

Career
Guyatt has published over 1200 peer-reviewed articles in scientific journals, [5] many in leading medical journals such as The New England Journal of Medicine, The Lancet, Journal of the American Medical Association, and The BMJ. According to the Web of Science, his work has been cited over 100,000 times; according to Google Scholar over 340,000 times.  In a Google scholar tabulation of the world's most cited scientists, he is listed 14th.

His writing has included many educational articles regarding evidence-based medicine.  Guyatt is the co-editor of the Users' Guides to the Medical Literature, a comprehensive set of journal articles and a textbook for clinicians who wish to incorporate evidence-based medicine principles into their practices.  His contributions to quality of life research, randomized trials, meta-analysis and clinical practice guidelines have been considered groundbreaking. He has also written extensively on health care policy in the popular press.

From 1990 - 1997, Guyatt directed the residency program at McMaster University that trains physicians to be specialists in internal medicine.  He used that program as a laboratory for developing and testing approaches to residency education focused on evidence-based approaches to care delivery. Since 1993, Guyatt has chaired the Evidence-Based Clinical Practice Workshop at McMaster University, an annual workshop on teaching and incorporating evidence-based principles into clinical practice.

Along with Holger Jens Schünemann, Guyatt is the co-chair of the Grading of Recommendations Assessment, Development and Evaluation (GRADE)  working group that began in the year 2000 as an informal collaboration of people with an interest in addressing the shortcomings of grading systems in clinical practice guidelines and systematic reviews. Guyatt played a key role in the development and refinement of the GRADE approach, a sensible and transparent structure for grading quality (or certainty) of evidence and strength of recommendations.  The GRADE approach is now considered the standard in systematic review and guideline development with over 100 health care organizations worldwide having adopted the approach, including the World Health Organization, Centers for Disease Control, American College of Physicians and the Cochrane Collaboration.[6]

With regard to his social activism, Guyatt previously published a regular health column on the editorial pages of the Winnipeg Free Press, and prior to that in The Hamilton Spectator, [7] In 1979, Guyatt co-founded the Medical Reform Group, a Canadian organization of physicians and medical students devoted to universal public health care.  The group continued its work for 35 years, after which the Canadian Doctors for Medicare has led the Canadian progressive medical community in addressing the issues that were central to the Medical Reform Group.

Guyatt ran as the New Democratic Party (NDP) candidate in the 2004, 2006 and 2008 Canadian federal elections in the riding of Ancaster—Dundas—Flamborough—Westdale and previously ran for the NDP in the 2000 federal election in the former riding of Ancaster—Dundas—Flamborough—Aldershot.

Notable awards and honours
In 1996, Guyatt received the McMaster University President's Award for Excellence in Teaching (Course or Resource Design).

He is a Fellow of the Canadian Academy of Health Sciences.

In 2010, he was conferred the title, "Distinguished University Professor," the highest and rarest academic rank held by a full-time faculty member at McMaster University.

In 2010, he was one of 10 candidates short-listed (from a list of 117 nominees) for the BMJ Lifetime Achievement Award and ultimately finished second.

In 2011, he was appointed as an Officer of the Order of Canada "for his contributions to the advancement of evidence-based medicine and its teaching."

In 2012, he was elected a Fellow of the Royal Society of Canada.

In 2015, he was made a member of the Canadian Medical Hall of Fame.

In 2022, he received honorary doctorate at the Faculty of Medicine of the University of Helsinki, Helsinki, Finland. Honorary doctorate, the title of doctor honoris causa, is the highest recognition of the University of Helsinki.

In 2022, the Einstein Foundation Berlin honored him with the Einstein Foundation Award for Promoting Quality in Research in the category international Individual Award.

Selected textbooks
 Guyatt G, Rennie D, Meade M, Cook D. Users' Guides to the Medical Literature: A Manual for Evidence-Based Clinical Practice, Second Edition. McGraw-Hill Professional, 2008.
 Haynes RB, Sackett DL, Guyatt GH, Tugwell P. Clinical Epidemiology: How to Do Clinical Practice Research, Third Edition. Philadelphia: Lippincott, Williams and Wilkins, 2006.
 DiCenso A, Guyatt G, Ciliska D. Evidence-Based Nursing: A Guide to Clinical Practice. Mosby, 2005.

References

External links
Gordon Guyatt bio on the McMaster University website.
Medical Reform Group website
Gordon Guyatt's health policy columns, 2005

1953 births
Living people
Canadian epidemiologists
Canadian medical researchers
New Democratic Party candidates for the Canadian House of Commons
Academic staff of McMaster University
People in evidence-based medicine
Officers of the Order of Canada
Ontario candidates for Member of Parliament
University of Toronto alumni
McMaster University alumni
Fellows of the Royal Society of Canada